The building at 941–955 Boylston Street in the Back Bay district of Boston, Massachusetts was designed by Arthur H. Vinal in 1886, while he was City Architect, as the city's first combined fire and police station.  The building, constructed in 1887, is in the Richardsonian Romanesque style, as was Vinal's most notable other work, the Chestnut Hill Water Works pumping station, built at about the same time.  It has been designated a Boston Landmark by the Boston Landmarks Commission.

The fire station at 941 Boylston, which is still active, houses Boston Fire Department Engine Company 33 and Ladder Company 15.  The police station, 955 Boylston, was home to Boston Police Department Division 16 until 1976.  From 1976 to 2007, the police station was home to the Institute of Contemporary Art; in 2007 it was acquired by Boston Architectural College for $7.22 million.

A courtyard between the two buildings originally led to shared stables for fire department and police horses.  Division 16 would later add a single-story building immediately to the west (out of frame in the photo above).  By 1976, the advent of motorized patrols had led to a consolidation of Boston's smaller police divisions, including division 16, into larger police districts, resulting in the closure and redevelopment of the police station.

Plaques on the Boylston St. facade memorialize four Boston firefighters who died in the line of duty: Cornelius J. Noonan (d. 1938), Richard F. Concannon (d. 1961), Richard B. Magee (d. 1972), and Stephen F. Minehan (d. 1994).

References

External links

Government buildings in Boston
Fire stations completed in 1887
Fire stations in Massachusetts
Government buildings completed in 1887
Landmarks in Back Bay, Boston
Richardsonian Romanesque architecture in Massachusetts
1887 establishments in Massachusetts
Boston Architectural College